The Greatest Hit (Money Mountain) is the debut studio album by English post-punk band Blue Orchids, released in 1982 by Rough Trade Records.

It reached number 5 in the UK Indie Chart.

Reception 

Chicago Reader called the album "one of British postpunk's greatest moments".

Track listing
All tracks composed by Martin Bramah, Rick Goldstraw and Una Baines
"Sun Connection"
"Dumb Magician"
"Tighten My Belt"
"A Year With No Head"
"Hanging Man"
"Bad Education"
"Wait"
"No Looking Back"
"Low Profile"
"Mad As the Mist and Snow"

Personnel
Blue Orchids
Martin Bramah - guitar, vocals
Rick Goldstraw - guitar, bass
Una Baines - keyboards
Toby Toman - drums, percussion
with:
The Super Reals - backing vocals

References

External links 
 

1982 debut albums
Rough Trade Records albums
Blue Orchids albums